Paangshu (The Soil) is a 2018 Sri Lankan Sinhalese drama film directed by Visakesa Chandrasekaram and co-produced by Havelock Arts studios and TVT. It stars Nita Fernando and Nadee Kammellaweera in lead roles along with Jagath Manuwarna and Nilmini Buwaneka in supportive roles. Music composed by Chinthaka Jayakody.

In September 2018, the film was screened at the Montreal Film Festival. The film has received positive reviews from critics. The film has been screened at Jogja-Netpac Asian Film Festival 2019 within Asian Feature Competition category.

The film was released in the island on 21 August 2020 in thirty leading cinemas of Ridma circuit. In October 2020, lead actress Nita Fernando was adjudged Special Jury Mention for Best Actress at Indus Valley International Film Festival.

Plot
In a rural courthouse, a mother seeks justice for her son who was abducted by paramilitary men during the 1988-89 insurgency in Sri Lanka, only to discover that she has to confront the man who took away her son and his wife.

Cast
 Nita Fernando as Babanona	
 Nadee Kammellaweera as Namalee	
 Jagath Manuwarna as Indika
 Nilmini Buwaneka		
 Malcom Machado		
 Randika Gunathilaka		
 Gayan Lakruwan		
 Xavier Kanishka		
 Mayura Kanchana Perera		
 Grace Ariyawimal		
 Yehani Hansika		
 Daya Wayaman		
 Hal Yamanouchi as Alieno
 Kumudu Kumarasinghe

References

External links
 
 Soil on Facebook
 Paangshu on YouTube

2010s Sinhala-language films
2018 films